Geopolymer cement is a binding system that hardens at room temperature. 
It is a more environmentally friendly alternative to conventional Portland cement. It relies on minimally processed natural materials or industrial byproducts to significantly reduce the carbon footprint of cement production, while also being highly resistant to many common concrete durability issues.

Geopolymer cements exist which may cure more rapidly than Portland-based cements.

Production

Production of geopolymer cement requires an aluminosilicate precursor material such as metakaolin or fly ash, a user-friendly alkaline reagent (for example, sodium or potassium soluble silicates with a molar ratio MR SiO2:M2O ≥ 1.65, M being Na or K) and water (See the definition for "user-friendly" reagent below). Room temperature hardening is more readily achieved with the addition of a source of calcium cations, often blast furnace slag.

Geopolymer cements can be formulated to cure more rapidly than Portland-based cements; some mixes gain most of their ultimate strength within 24 hours. However, they must also set slowly enough that they can be mixed at a batch plant, either for precasting or delivery in a concrete mixer. Geopolymer cement also has the ability to form a strong chemical bond with silicate rock-based aggregates. In March 2010, the US Department of Transportation Federal Highway Administration released a TechBrief titled Geopolymer Concrete that states: 
The production of versatile, cost-effective geopolymer cements that can be mixed and hardened essentially like Portland cement would represent a game changing advancement, revolutionizing the construction of transportation infrastructure and the building industry.

Geopolymer concrete

There is often confusion between the meanings of the terms 'geopolymer cement' and 'geopolymer concrete'. A cement is a binder, whereas concrete is the composite material resulting from the mixing and hardening of cement with water (or an alkaline solution in the case of geopolymer cement), and stone aggregates. Materials of both types (geopolymer cements and geopolymer concretes) are commercially available in various markets internationally

Chemistry:  Portland cement vs Geopolymer cement 

Left: hardening of Portland cement (P.C.) through hydration of calcium silicate into calcium silicate hydrate (C-Si-H) and portlandite, Ca(OH)2.

Right: hardening (setting) of geopolymer cement (GP) through poly-condensation of potassium oligo-(sialate-siloxo) into potassium poly(sialate-siloxo) cross linked network.

If a geopolymer compound requires heat setting it is not  called geopolymer cement but rather geopolymer binder.

Alkali-activated materials vs. geopolymer cements. 

Geopolymerization chemistry requires appropriate terminologies and notions that are evidently different from those in use by Portland cement experts. The main article geopolymer summarizes how geopolymer cements belong to the category of inorganic polymer. On this matter, the Australian Geopolymer Alliance outlines on its web site the following statement: "Joseph Davidovits developed the notion of a geopolymer (a Si/Al inorganic polymer) to better explain these chemical processes and the resultant material properties. To do so required a major shift in perspective, away from the classical crystalline hydration chemistry of conventional cement chemistry. To date this shift has not been well accepted by practitioners in the field of alkali activated cements who still tend to explain such reaction chemistry in Portland cement terminology.

Indeed, geopolymer cement is sometimes mistaken for alkali-activated cement and concrete, developed more than 50 years ago by V.D. Glukhovsky in Ukraine, the former Soviet Union. They were originally known under the names "soil silicate concretes" and "soil cements". Because Portland cement concretes can be affected by the deleterious Alkali-aggregate reaction, coined AAR or Alkali-silica reaction coined ASR (see for example the RILEM Committee 219-ACS Aggregate Reaction in Concrete Structures ), the wording alkali-activation has a negative impact on civil engineers. However, geopolymer cements do not in general show these deleterious reactions (see below in Properties), when an appropriate aggregate is selected - geopolymers can also work in acidic mediums, further disassociating them from AAM. In addition, alkali-activated materials are not polymers, so they cannot be called and mistaken for geopolymers. Indeed, the polymer chemistry is radically different compared to the calcium hydrate or precipitate chemistry. Nevertheless, several cement scientists continue to promote the terminology related to alkali-activated materials or alkali-activated geopolymers. These cements, abbreviated AAM, encompass the specific fields of alkali-activated slags, alkali-activated coal fly ashes, and various blended cementing systems (see RILEM Technical committee 247-DTA).

User-friendly alkaline-reagents 

Although geopolymerization does not rely on toxic organic solvents but only on water, it needs chemical ingredients that may be dangerous and therefore requires some safety procedures. Material Safety rules classify the alkaline products in two categories: corrosive products (named here: hostile) and irritant products (named here: friendly). The two classes are recognizable through their respective logos.

The table lists some alkaline chemicals and their corresponding safety label. The corrosive products must be handled with gloves, glasses and masks. They are user-hostile and cannot be implemented in mass applications without the appropriate safety procedures. In the second category one finds Portland cement or hydrated lime, typical mass products. Geopolymeric alkaline reagents belonging to this class may also be termed as User-friendly, although the irritant nature of the alkaline component and the potential inhalation risk of powders still require the selection and use of appropriate personal protective equipment, as in any situation where chemicals or powders are handled.

The development of so-called alkali-activated-cements or alkali-activated geopolymers (the latter considered by some to be incorrect terminology), as well as several recipes found in the literature and on the Internet, especially those based on fly ashes, use alkali silicates with molar ratios SiO2:M2O below 1.20, or systems based on pure NaOH (8M or 12M). These conditions are not user-friendly for the ordinary labor force, and require careful consideration of personal protective equipment if employed in the field. Indeed, laws, regulations, and state directives push to enforce for more health protections and security protocols for workers’ safety.

Conversely, Geopolymer cement recipes employed in the field generally involve alkaline soluble silicates with starting molar ratios ranging from 1.45 to 1.95, particularly 1.60 to 1.85, i.e. user-friendly conditions. It may happen that for research, some laboratory recipes have molar ratios in the 1.20 to 1.45 range.

Geopolymer cement categories 

Categories of geopolymer cement include:
 Slag-based geopolymer cement.
 Rock-based geopolymer cement.
 Fly ash-based geopolymer cement
type 1: alkali-activated fly ash geopolymer.
type 2: slag/fly ash-based geopolymer cement.
 Ferro-sialate-based geopolymer cement.

Slag-based geopolymer cement 
Components: metakaolin (MK-750) + blast furnace slag + alkali silicate (user-friendly). 

Geopolymeric make-up: Si:Al = 2 in fact solid solution of Si:Al=1, Ca-poly(di-sialate) (anorthite type) + Si:Al =3 , K-poly(sialate-disiloxo) (orthoclase type) and C-S-H Ca-silicate hydrate.

The first geopolymer cement developed in the 1980s was of the type (K,Na,Ca)-poly(sialate) (or slag-based geopolymer cement) and resulted from the research developments carried out by Joseph Davidovits and J.L. Sawyer at Lone Star Industries, USA and yielded the invention of Pyrament® cement. The American patent application was filed in 1984 and the patent US 4,509,985 was granted on April 9, 1985, with the title 'Early high-strength mineral polymer'.

Rock-based geopolymer cement 
The replacement of a certain amount of MK-750 with selected volcanic tuffs yields geopolymer cement with better properties and less CO2 emission than the simple slag-based geopolymer cement.

Manufacture components: metakaolin MK-750, blast furnace slag, volcanic tuffs (calcined or not calcined), mine tailings and alkali silicate (user-friendly).
 
Geopolymeric make-up: Si:Al = 3, in fact solid solution of Si:Al=1  Ca-poly(di-sialate) (anorthite type) + Si:Al =3–5 (Na,K)-poly(silate-multisiloxo) and C-S-H Ca-silicate hydrate.

Fly ash-based geopolymer cements 
Later on, in 1997, building on the works conducted on slag-based geopolymeric cements, on the one hand and on the synthesis of zeolites from fly ashes on the other hand, Silverstrim et al. and van Jaarsveld and van Deventer developed geopolymeric fly ash-based cements. Silverstrim et al. US Patent 5,601,643 was titled 'Fly ash cementitious material and method of making a product'.

Presently, there are two types based on siliceous (EN 197) or Class F (ASTM C618) fly ashes: 
 Type 1: alkali-activated fly ash geopolymer (user-hostile):
In many cases requires heat curing at 60–80°C; not manufactured separately as a cement, but rather produced directly as a fly-ash based concrete. NaOH (user-hostile) + fly ash: partially-reacted fly ash particles embedded in an alumino-silicate gel with Si:Al= 1 to 2, zeolitic type (chabazite-Na and sodalite) structures. 
 Type 2: slag/fly ash-based geopolymer cement (user-friendly):
Room-temperature cement hardening. User-friendly silicate solution + blast furnace slag + fly ash: fly ash particles embedded in a geopolymeric matrix with Si:Al= 2, (Ca,K)-poly(sialate-siloxo).

Ferro-sialate-based geopolymer cement 
The properties are similar to those of rock-based geopolymer cement but involve geological elements with high iron oxide content. The geopolymeric make up is of the type poly(ferro-sialate) (Ca,K)-(-Fe-O)-(Si-O-Al-O-). This user-friendly geopolymer cement is in the development and commercialization phase.

CO2 emissions during manufacture 

According to the Australian concrete expert B. V. Rangan, the growing worldwide demand for concrete is a great opportunity for the development of geopolymer cements of all types, with their lower release of carbon dioxide CO2 during production.

CO2 emissions contrasted 

The manufacture of Portland cement clinker involves the calcination of calcium carbonate according to the reactions:
3CaCO3 + SiO2 → Ca3SiO5 + 3CO2 
2CaCO3 + SiO2 → Ca2SiO4 + 2CO2 
Reactions involving alumina also lead the formation of the aluminate and ferrite components of the clinker.

The production of 1 tonne of Portland clinker directly generates approximately 0.55 tonnes of chemical CO2, directly as a product of these reactions, and requires the combustion of carbonaceous fuel to yield approximately an additional 0.40 tonnes of carbon dioxide, although this is being reduced through gains in process efficiency and the use of waste as fuels. However, in total, 1 tonne of Portland cement leads to the emission of 0.8–1.0 tonnes of carbon dioxide.

Comparatively, Geopolymer cements do not rely on calcium carbonate as a key ingredient, and generate much less CO2 during manufacture, i.e. a reduction in the range of 40% to 80–90%. Joseph Davidovits delivered the first paper on this subject in March 1993 at a symposium organized by the American Portland Cement Association, Chicago, Illinois.

The Portland cement industry reacted strongly by lobbying the legal institutions to deliver CO2 emission numbers that did not include the part related to calcium carbonate decomposition, focusing only on combustion emission. An article written in the scientific magazine New Scientist in 1997 stated that: ...estimates for CO2 emissions from cement production have concentrated only on the former source [fuel combustion]. The UN’s Intergovernmental Panel on Climate Change puts the industry’s total contribution to CO2 emissions at 2.4 %; the Carbon Dioxide Information Analysis Center at the Oak Ridge National Laboratory in Tennessee quotes 2.6 %. Now Joseph Davidovits of the Geopolymer Institute... has for the first time looked at both sources. He has calculated that world cement production of 1.4 billion tonnes a year produces 7 % of [world] current CO2 emissions. Fifteen years later (2012), the situation has worsened with Portland cement CO2 emissions approaching 3 billion tonnes a year.

Comparative energy use 

The energy needs and CO2 emissions for regular Portland cement, rock-based geopolymer cements and fly ash-based geopolymer cements. The comparison proceeds between Portland cement and geopolymer cements with similar strength, i.e. average 40 MPa at 28 days. There have been several studies published on the subject that may be summarized in the following way:

Rock-based geopolymer cement manufacture involves: 
 70% by weight geological compounds (calcined at 700°C) 
 blast furnace slag  
 alkali-silicate solution (industrial chemical, user-friendly).
 
The presence of blast furnace slag provides room-temperature hardening and increases the mechanical strength.

Energy needs

According to the US Portland Cement Association (2006), energy needs for Portland cement is in the range of 4700 MJ/tonne (average). The calculation for Rock- based geopolymer cement is performed with following parameters:
 
- the blast furnace slag is available as by-product from the steel industry (no additional energy needed); 
- or must be manufactured (re-smelting from non granulated slag or from geological resources).

In the most favorable case — slag availability as by-product — there is a reduction of 59% of the energy needs in the manufacture of Rock-based geopolymer-cement in comparison with Portland cement. In the least favorable case —slag manufacture — the reduction reaches 43%.

CO2 emissions during manufacture

In the most favorable case — slag availability as by-product — there is a reduction of 80% of the CO2 emission during manufacture of Rock-based geopolymer cement in comparison with Portland cement. In the least favorable case —slag manufacture — the reduction reaches 70%.

Fly ash-based cements Class F fly ashes

They do not require any further heat treatment. The calculation is therefore easier. One achieves emissions in the range of 0.09 to 0.25 tonnes of CO2 / 1 tonne of fly ash-based cement, i.e. CO2 emissions that are reduced in the range of 75 to 90%.

Workability issues 

Generally, one of the main problems with geopolymer binder is its poor workability: Alkali-activated Fly Ash has a much greater plastic viscosity than OPC and is prone to fast setting. In a matter of minutes, it can produce “highly viscous, unmanageable concrete mixtures”.

These problems were faced with Portland cement as well, leading to the development of mix designs and admixtures that increase workability; to a limited extent, those techniques can be applied to geopolymer binder.

Experimental evidence suggests that there are numerous ways to enhance geopolymer workability:
 Using different combinations of precursor and activator
 Adjusting the activator concentration and the ratio of activator to precursor
 Increasing the water/binder ratio (as in Portland cement, this will increase workability and decrease concrete strength, which can then be counteracted by strength-enhancing measures such as heat curing) 
 Adding certain conventional superplasticizers to certain precursors/activator combinations
 Adding newly developed superplasticizers for geopolymer binder (such as Alccofine, ground granulated blast-furnace slag, glass powder and rice husk)

Using these techniques, geopolymer binder has been shown to be suitable for both high-strength concrete applications as well as for self-compacting concrete.

Properties for Rock-based geopolymer cement (Ca,K)-poly(sialate-disiloxo) 

See

 shrinkage during setting: < 0.05%, not measurable.  
 compressive strength (uniaxial): > 90 MPa at 28 days (for high early strength formulation, 20 MPa after 4 hours).  
 flexural strength: 10–15 MPa at 28 days (for high early strength  of 10 MPa after 24 hours).  
 Young Modulus: > 2 GPa.  
 freeze-thaw: mass loss < 0.1% (ASTM D4842), strength loss  <5 % after 180 cycles. 

 wet-dry: mass loss < 0.1% (ASTM D4843). 
 leaching in water, after 180 days: K2O < 0.015%. 
 water absorption: < 3%, not related to permeability. 
 hydraulic permeability: 10−10 m/s. 
 sulfuric acid, 10%: mass loss 0.1% per day. 
 hydrochloric acid, 5%: mass loss 1% per day. 
 KOH 50%: mass loss 0.02% per day. 
 ammonia solution: no observed mass loss. 
 sulfate solution: shrinkage 0.02% at 28 days. 
 alkali-aggregate reaction: no expansion after 250 days (−0.01%), as shown in the figure, comparison with Portland cement (ASTM C227). These results were published in 1993. Geopolymer binders and cements even with alkali contents as high as 10%, do not generate any dangerous alkali-aggregate reaction when used with an aggregate of normal reactivity.

The need for standards 

In June 2012, the institution ASTM International (former American Society for Testing and Materials, ASTM) organized a symposium on Geopolymer Binder Systems. The introduction to the symposium states: When performance specifications for Portland cement were written, non-portland binders were uncommon...New binders such as geopolymers are being increasingly researched, marketed as specialty products, and explored for use in structural concrete. This symposium is intended to provide an opportunity for ASTM to consider whether the existing cement standards provide, on the one hand, an effective framework for further exploration of geopolymer binders and, on the other hand, reliable protection for users of these materials.

The existing Portland cement standards are not adapted to geopolymer cements. They must be created by an ad hoc committee. Yet, to do so, requires also the presence of standard geopolymer cements. Presently, every expert is presenting his own recipe based on local raw materials (wastes, by-products or extracted). There is a need for selecting the right geopolymer cement category. The 2012 State of the Geopolymer R&D, suggested to select two categories, namely:
 Type 2 slag/fly ash-based geopolymer cement: fly ashes are available in the major emerging countries; 
and
 Ferro-sialate-based geopolymer cement: this geological iron rich raw material is present in all countries throughout the globe.
and 
 the appropriate user-friendly geopolymeric reagent.

References

Bibliography

 Geopolymer Chemistry and Applications, Joseph Davidovits, Institut Géopolymère, Saint-Quentin, France, 2008,  (4th ed., 2015). In Chinese: National Defense Industry Press, Beijing, 2012.
 Geopolymers Structure, processing, properties and industrial applications, John L. Provis and Jannie S. J. van Deventer, Woodhead Publishing, 2009, .

External links
 Geopolymer Institute: https://www.geopolymer.org/
 Geopolymer Alliance: https://web.archive.org/web/20130409024601/http://geopolymers.com.au/

Geopolymers
Inorganic chemistry
Geochemistry
Polymers
Inorganic polymers
Cement
Building materials